Charles Lee "Chucky" Ray (born May 1, 1958) is the main antagonist of the Child's Play slasher film franchise. Chucky is portrayed as a vicious serial killer who, as he bleeds out from a gunshot wound, transfers his soul into a "Good Guy" doll and continuously tries to transfer it to a human body. He later decides to transfer his soul across numerous doll bodies (each with their own memories) in an attempt to take over the world. The character has become one of the most recognizable horror icons and has been referenced numerous times in popular culture. In 1999, the Chucky character was nominated for the MTV Movie Award for Best Villain for the film Bride of Chucky. He was created by writer John Lafia for a rewrite of Don Mancini's original script for Child's Play and is portrayed by Brad Dourif in both live action and voice over. For the 2019 remake of the same name, Mark Hamill voiced an artificial intelligence (AI) version of Chucky as a tragic villain, having previously voiced the Charles Lee Ray version of the character in an episode of Robot Chicken.

Appearances

Film

Chucky made his first appearance in the 1988 film Child's Play. In the film, a serial killer named Charles Lee Ray, aka Chucky (Brad Dourif) uses a voodoo ritual inside a toy store to transfer his soul into a Good Guy doll to escape from Detective Mike Norris (Chris Sarandon). Pretending to be an inanimate object, Chucky later is given to young Andy Barclay (Alex Vincent) and begins terrorizing the family, even when they realize that he is alive.

Chucky made his second appearance in the 1990 sequel, Child's Play 2. In the film, a resurrected Chucky continues his pursuit of Andy, who has been placed in foster care after the events of the first film.

In Child's Play 3 (1991), Chucky again returns from the dead eight years after the events of the previous film to terrorize a now teenage Andy (Justin Whalin) who is currently in a military academy.

Bride of Chucky (1998) continues the story, with Chucky being resurrected by a former accomplice and girlfriend Tiffany Valentine (Jennifer Tilly). After transferring Tiffany's soul into a bride doll, the two terrorize a young couple in an attempt to transfer their souls into human bodies.

Seed of Chucky (2004) follows six years after the previous film when Glen/Glenda (voiced by Billy Boyd), the child of Chucky and Tiffany brings his parents back to life. The trio then set their sights on actress Jennifer Tilly (in a fictionalized version of herself), for whom they have sinister plans.

The 2013 film Curse of Chucky saw the series return to the straightforward horror elements found in the first three films. The film takes place twenty-five years after the events of the first film. Chucky arrives at the house of Nica Pierce (Fiona Dourif) and her mother Sarah, a woman with a connection to his past. He ends up killing Sarah and the rest of Nica's family before framing her for the murders.

In Cult of Chucky (2017), Chucky returns to torment a now institutionalized Nica, while a now-adult Andy (Alex Vincent) attempts to stop Chucky's plans once and for all. At one point, Chucky figures out how to split his soul into many bodies at once, thus creating a ‘cult’.

Chucky has a brief cameo as a program in the OASIS virtual reality simulation in the film adaptation of Ready Player One.

In the 2019 reboot of Child's Play, Chucky (voiced by Mark Hamill) is presented as a high-tech artificially-intelligent Buddi doll created by the Kaslan Corporation. Primarily designed to be a life-long companion to its owner by learning from its surroundings and acting accordingly, Buddi dolls can also connect to and operate other Kaslan products. One such doll has its safety precautions disabled by a disgruntled Kaslan employee during the assembly process, and as a result, Chucky gradually develops murderous tendencies as he tries to eliminate anyone or anything who's stopping him and his "best buddy", his owner Andy Barclay (Gabriel Bateman) from staying best friends forever.

Television
Chucky made his return to television on the October 12, 2021 premiere of Chucky, the sequel to Cult of Chucky. In this TV series, Chucky encounters 14-year-old middle school student Jake
Wheeler at a yard sale with
his intentions to use him for his art project. After Wheeler learns who Chucky is and his intentions, Chucky becomes an archenemy of his, as well as his friends, Devon Evons and Lexy Cross, and continuously terrorizes them. In season two, one Chucky doll gets amnesia and decides to be good, helping Wheeler. A younger version of Chucky as a human also appeared in flashback scenes which were portrayed by David Kohlsmith and Tyler Barish. In flashbacks of the 1980s he's played by Fiona Dourif (who also appears in the present time as Nica Pierce) dubbed by Brad Dourif.

Other
On the October 12, 1998, episode of WCW Monday Nitro, Chucky made an appearance as a heel to promote Bride of Chucky and in the process confronting Gene Okerlund and Rick Steiner. On October 26, 2021, Chucky co-hosted NXT: Halloween Havoc as a face assisting with the spin the wheel make a deal matches. On October 22, 2022, Chucky returned at NXT Halloween Havoc once again assisting with the spin the wheel make a deal matches and making appearances throughout the event.

Backstory

Events prior to Child's Play (1988) 

Charles Lee Ray was born on May 1st 1958, in Hackensack, New Jersey to Peter and Elizabeth Ray. In contrast to his claims that killing has been in his family for "generations", as far as shown, Charles had a loving family growing up, but unknown to both of his parents he suffered from a severe case of sadistic and homicidal urges. When Charles was seven years old, after returning home from trick-or-treating on Halloween, he checked all his candy until he decided to pick up an apple that he received and noticed a razor blade stuck inside it. He bit into it regardless, he smiled after the razor blade cut into his mouth causing it to bleed. In 1965, on his 7th birthday Charles used a mallet to knock the piñata to the ground but continued to aggressively smash it even after it had fallen. News that the Hackensack Slasher, a serial killer, was on the loose on the radio, and delighted in plunging a knife into his birthday cake. Some time later, the Hackensack Slasher broke into his home and killed his father right in front of him. His mother attempted to hide in a closet with him, however, when the Hackensack Slasher found them, he was surprised to see that Charles had stabbed his mother to death, claiming to have helped. Impressed by the boy's actions, the Hackensack Slasher gave him advice that he should always cover his tracks, and wiped the blood off his pocketknife before handing it back to him.

After his parents' deaths, Charles was placed in the Burlington County home for wayward boys. He received therapy from a woman named Dr. Amanda Mixter, who referred to him as "Charlie", however instead of helping young Charles, Mixter encouraged him to embrace his homicidal tendencies. She also destroyed the remaining humanity Charles had left, claiming to have found that part of him boring. During one of their sessions, she asks him if he planned on killing his mother or if it was a spontaneous decision. In another session in 1972 when Charles was 14, she asks which method of killing is his favorite. He confirms that he likes both planned and spontaneous killings, but spontaneous killings are the most fun and the two spend time dancing together. Charles was known for playing with the smaller children and attempted to mold three boys into following his killer footsteps, teaching them swear words and reading them fairy tales twisted to revolve around murder. 

One day, after tracking mud through the hallway, he was yelled at by the Janitor, whom he killed by slitting his throat. He cut off his hand and presented his mutilated body as "Captain Hook" to a group of children while they were imitating Peter Pan and the Lost Boys, leaving them horrified, with the exception of a young boy named Eddie Caputo, who would become his future accomplice. When the police came Charles decided to run away, leaving the janitor's severed hand behind as a gift for Eddie before fleeing into the night. He also loses contact with Mixter after he is forced to flee the orphanage.

In 1984 Charles was involved with the deaths of nine people and injuries of another five, according to state media he was the chief suspect in a recent kidnapping on Friday and also shot a police officer who tried to stop and question him over the weekend. 

In 1986, Charles picked up a woman named Delilah and a red-headed woman from a nightclub and then brought them back to a hotel. The two women engaged in foreplay with Charles interrupting them by pulling the red-headed woman aside and holding a knife over her. To his surprise instead of being afraid, the woman instructed him to go through with it. Ray then chose to kill Delilah instead, stabbing her and passing the knife to the redhead to join in. After killing her together, the couple kissed passionately on the bed where the redhead told Charles her name is Tiffany before suggesting Charles "should be Chucky" and he, in turn, suggested she should be blonde. Chucky and Tiffany left Hackensack in 1987 after killing a man that was attempting to sell a car which they proceeded to drive out of town with.

In 1988 Chucky along with Tiffany had relocated to Chicago, Illinois, during which he had a double life as a serial killer and regular civilian. He studied Voodoo under the guidance of a practitioner named John Bishop in an attempt to learn how to cheat death. Unbeknownst to John, Chucky perverted those teachings, which were intended to be used for good, to commit a series of ritual murders, eventually becoming known as the Lakeshore Strangler. By this point in time, his known accomplices that helped carry out his misdeeds were his continued lover, Tiffany Valentine, and his old mentee, Eddie Caputo. Among his many murder victims was a woman named Vivian Van Pelt, whom he stole a $6,000 ring from for profit, which Tiffany eventually found and mistook as an engagement ring Charles intended to give to her. It is also greatly implied that he killed Tiffany's mother around this point in time. 

While at a neighborhood barbecue, a mutual friend introduces him to a woman named Sarah and her family. He looks down at a young Barb, and remarks that she has her mother's eyes. Charles becomes obsessed with Sarah and wanting her for himself, drives up to Daniel one night and offers him a ride home. Sometime during this ride, Charles drowns him, making it look like an accident. He attends Daniel's funeral and proceeds to kidnap Sarah shortly after. 

Around the same time tensions rose between Charles and Tiffany when Tiffany found out Chucky was killing people without her. Tiffany then made an anonymous call to the police, telling them the whereabouts of the Lakeshore Strangler. The police found where Chucky was holding Sarah and angrily believing she had turned him in, stabbed her in the stomach, which would leave her unborn child Nica Pierce paralyzed from the waist down. Not long after a chase ensued between Chucky and Detective Mike Norris.

Development

Design
In the original script for Child's Play, titled Batteries Not Included, a doll named 'Buddy' comes to life after Andy mixed his blood with the doll's fake blood and would have targeted his enemies, being an outlet for Andy's suppressed rage. However, writer John Lafia later rewrote Mancini's original script and created the character of Charles Lee Ray to possess the doll (now named 'Chucky') and have him go after his enemies instead.

Child's Play creator and co-writer Don Mancini explained that Chucky draws heavily from the My Buddy dolls: "In my original script, he was originally called Buddy, and we couldn't use it because of the 'My Buddy' doll. The director went out and got a 'My Buddy' doll, a Raggedy Ann, a Raggedy Andy, and one of those life-size baby infants. What I told [designer] Kevin Yagher was, I wanted something similar to a My Buddy doll. I described "Buddy" in my original script, now "Chucky", as wearing red-buttoned overalls, red sneakers, striped sweater, with red hair, blue eyes, and freckles. Kevin went off and sketched many designs of Chucky until the final was picked. Yagher then built the first doll from those sketches and my details".

Performance
For the first three films, Chucky was controlled by a team of nine puppeteers, led by Brock Winkless, who moved Chucky's mouth via radio control, wearing a rig that captured his mouth movement. The others were in charge of operating the doll's head, face, and limbs. By Curse of Chucky, Chucky's mouth, now performed by lead puppeteer Tony Gardner of Alterian, Inc., was now operated via a radio-control unit without the need for a rig, and the doll himself now required fewer people to bring him to life. For the first film, for scenes where Chucky had to move around in wide shots, a little-person actor in a life-sized costume, Ed Gale, would portray Chucky in scenes where the character is walking, the props on the set enlarged to fit the size of the actor.

See also
 Killer toys
 Robert (doll)
 Slappy the Dummy
 Annabelle (doll)

References

Child's Play (franchise) characters
Fictional characters from California
Fictional characters from Chicago
Fictional characters from New Jersey
Fictional characters who can duplicate themselves
Fictional characters who use magic
Fictional characters with spirit possession or body swapping abilities
Fictional demons and devils
Fictional dolls and dummies
Fictional knife-fighters
Fictional mass murderers
Fictional monsters
Fictional puppets
Fictional rampage and spree killers
Fictional serial killers
Film characters introduced in 1988
Film supervillains
Male horror film villains
Slasher film antagonists
Undead supervillains
Universal Pictures